Erythrina chiapasana is a perennial woody plant in the family Fabaceae. It has a native range from South Mexico to Guatemala. Its name relates to Chiapas, Southern Mexico.

References

Bibliography 

chiapasana
Flora of Mexico